This list of early medieval watermills comprises a selection of European watermills spanning the early Middle Ages, from 500 to 1000 AD.

Historical overview 

Largely unaffected from the turbulent political events following the demise of the Western Roman Empire, the importance of watermilling continued to grow under the new Germanic lords. The sharp rise in numbers of early medieval watermills coincided with the appearance of new documentary genres (legal codes, monastic charters, hagiography) which were more inclined to address such a relatively mundane device than the ancient urban-centered literary class had been. This partly explains the relative abundance of medieval literary references to watermills compared to former times.

The quantitative growth of medieval evidence appears to be more than a mere reflection of the changing nature of surviving sources. By Carolingian times, references to watermills  in the Frankish Realm had become "innumerable". At the time of the compilation of the Domesday Book (1086), there were an estimated 6,500 watermills in England alone.

By the early 7th century, watermills were well established in Ireland, and began to spread from the former territory of the empire into the non-romanized parts of Germany a century later. The introduction of the ship mill  and tide mill in the 6th century, both of which yet unattested for the ancient period, allowed for a flexible response to the changing water-level of rivers and the Atlantic Ocean, thus demonstrating the technological innovativeness of early medieval watermillers.

Earliest evidence 
Below the earliest medieval evidence for different types of watermills. This list complements its ancient counterpart.

Written sources 
In the following, literary, epigraphical and documentary sources referring to watermills and other water-driven machines are listed.

Archaeological finds

Watermill sites 
Below are listed excavated or surveyed watermill sites dated to the early medieval period.

Millstones 
The following list comprises stray finds of early medieval millstones. Note that there is no way to distinguish millstones driven by water-power from those powered by animals turning a capstan. Most, however, are assumed to derive from watermills.

References

Notes

Sources

Further reading

External links 
The Oxford Roman Economy Project: The uptake of mechanical technology in the ancient world: the water-mill – Quantitative data on watermills up to 700 AD

Watermills
Medieval
Watermills
Watermills